Flasher is a city in Morton County, North Dakota, United States. It is part of the "Bismarck, ND Metropolitan Statistical Area" or "Bismarck-Mandan". The population was 217 at the 2020 census. Flasher was founded in 1902.

History
Flasher was platted in 1902. The city was named in honor of Mabel Flasher, the relative of a town promoter. A post office has been in operation at Flasher since 1903.

Geography
Flasher is located at  (46.454942, -101.232920).

Demographics

2010 census
As of the census of 2010, there were 232 people, 113 households, and 58 families living in the city. The racial makeup of the city was 97.8% White, 0.4% Native American, 0.4% Asian, and 1.3% from two or more races.

There were 113 households, of which 29.2% had children under the age of 18 living with them, 42.5% were married couples living together, 6.2% had a female householder with no husband present, 2.7% had a male householder with no wife present, and 48.7% were non-families. 46.9% of all households were made up of individuals, and 18.5% had someone living alone who was 65 years of age or older. The average household size was 2.05 and the average family size was 3.00.

The median age in the city was 40.6 years. 25.4% of residents were under the age of 18; 3.1% were between the ages of 18 and 24; 24.1% were from 25 to 44; 28.9% were from 45 to 64; and 18.5% were 65 years of age or older. The gender makeup of the city was 50.0% male and 50.0% female.

2000 census
As of the census of 2000, there were 285 people, 130 households, and 72 families living in the city. The population density was 408.0 people per square mile (157.2/km2). There were 155 housing units at an average density of 221.9 per square mile (85.5/km2). The racial makeup of the city was 97.89% White, 0.35% Native American, 0.35% Asian, and 1.40% from two or more races. Hispanic or Latino of any race were 1.05% of the population. Flasher, North Dakota was established by multiple German families from Russia in the early 1900s.  It is rumored that one of the sons from the ship was left behind and is now living in Germany, in a small village near Heidelberg.

There were 130 households, out of which 26.9% had children under the age of 18 living with them, 47.7% were married couples living together, 3.8% had a female householder with no husband present, and 44.6% were non-families. 40.0% of all households were made up of individuals, and 26.9% had someone living alone who was 65 years of age or older. The average household size was 2.19 and the average family size was 2.94.

In the city, the population was spread out, with 24.9% under the age of 18, 5.3% from 18 to 24, 19.3% from 25 to 44, 20.4% from 45 to 64, and 30.2% who were 65 years of age or older. The median age was 46 years. For every 100 females, there were 93.9 males. For every 100 females age 18 and over, there were 92.8 males.

The median income for a household in the city was $20,313, and the median income for a family was $40,556. Males had a median income of $24,167 versus $28,750 for females. The per capita income for the city was $13,970. About 9.7% of families and 16.4% of the population were below the poverty line, including 23.4% of those under the age of eighteen and 12.7% of those 65 or over.

Climate
This climatic region is typified by large seasonal temperature differences, with warm to hot (and often humid) summers and cold (sometimes severely cold) winters.  According to the Köppen Climate Classification system, Flasher has a humid continental climate, abbreviated "Dfb" on climate maps.

Notable people
Hilaire du Berrier - pilot, barnstormer, and spy

See also
 Hotel Brown

References

Cities in North Dakota
Cities in Morton County, North Dakota
Populated places established in 1903
1903 establishments in North Dakota